William Daniel Phillips (born November 5, 1948) is an American physicist. He shared the Nobel Prize in Physics, in 1997, with Steven Chu and Claude Cohen-Tannoudji.

Biography
Phillips was born to William Cornelius Phillips of Juniata, Pennsylvania, and Mary Catherine Savino of Ripacandida, Italy. He is of Italian descent on his mother's side and of Welsh descent on his father's side. His parents moved to Camp Hill (near Harrisburg, Pennsylvania) in 1959, where he attended high school and graduated valedictorian of his class in 1966. He graduated from Juniata College in 1970 summa cum laude. After that he received his physics doctorate from the Massachusetts Institute of Technology.  In 1978 he joined NIST.

In 1996, he received the Albert A. Michelson Medal from The Franklin Institute.

Phillips' doctoral thesis concerned the magnetic moment of the proton in H2O. He later did some work with Bose–Einstein condensates. In 1997 he won the Nobel Prize in Physics together with Claude Cohen-Tannoudji and Steven Chu for his contributions to laser cooling, a technique to slow the movement of gaseous atoms in order to better study them, at the National Institute of Standards and Technology, and especially for his invention of the Zeeman slower.

Phillips is also a professor of physics, which is part of the University of Maryland College of Computer, Mathematical, and Natural Sciences at University of Maryland, College Park.

Phillips is one of the 20 American recipients of the Nobel Prize in Physics to sign a letter addressed to President George W. Bush in May 2008, urging him to "reverse the damage done to basic science research in the Fiscal Year 2008 Omnibus Appropriations Bill" by requesting additional emergency funding for the Department of Energy’s Office of Science, the National Science Foundation, and the National Institute of Standards and Technology.

He was one of the 35 Nobel laureates who signed a letter urging President Obama to provide a stable $15 billion per year support for clean energy research, technology and demonstration.

He is one of three well-known scientists and Methodist laity who have involved themselves in the religion and science dialogue. The other two scientists and fellow Methodists are chemist Charles Coulson and 1981 Nobel laureate Arthur Leonard Schawlow.

In October 2010, Phillips participated in the USA Science and Engineering Festival's lunch with a laureate program where middle and high school students got to engage in an informal conversation with a Nobel Prize-winning scientist over a brown-bag lunch. Phillips is also a member of the USA Science and Engineering Festival's advisory board.

Awards and honors 
Phillips has been awarded numerous honors.

 Outstanding Young Scientist Award of the Maryland Academy of Sciences, 1982.
 Silver Medal of the Department of Commerce, 1983
 Samuel Wesley Stratton Award of the National Bureau of Standards, 1987
 Arthur S. Flemming Award of the Washington Downtown Jaycees, 1988
 Gold Medal of the Dept. of Commerce, 1993.
 Election to American Academy of Arts and Sciences 1995
 Election as a NIST Fellow, 1995
 Michelson Medal of the Franklin Institute 1996
 Election to the National Academy of Sciences 1997
 Nobel Prize in Physics 1997 
 Arthur L. Schawlow Prize in Laser Science (APS) 1998
 Golden Plate Award of the American Academy of Achievement 1999
 Richtmeyer Award of the Am. Assoc. of Physics Teachers 2000
 Election to the European Academy of Arts, Sciences and Humanities (titular member), 2000
 Appointed an Academician of the Pontifical Academy of Sciences 2004. 
 Presidential Rank Award, 2005 
 Service to America Award – Career Achievement  - 2006
 Honorary Liveryman of the Worshipful Company of Scientific Instrument Makers

Personal life

Phillips married Jane Van Wynen shortly before he went to MIT. Neither had been regular churchgoers early in their marriage. However, in 1979, they joined the Fairhaven United Methodist Church in Gaithersburg, Maryland because they appreciated its diversity. He is a founding member of the International Society for Science and Religion. He and his wife have two daughters; Caitlin Phillips (born 1979) who founded Rebound Designs, and Christine Phillips (b 1981) who works in Science Communication.

During a seminar at the University of Maryland Department of Chemistry and Biochemistry titled Coherent Atoms in Optical Lattices Phillips stated, "Rubidium is God's gift to Bose–Einstein condensates."

References

External links

 including the Nobel Lecture on December 8, 1997 Laser Cooling and Trapping of Neutral Atoms
Curriculum Vitae from NIST.
Atoms floating in optical molasses. Press Release: The 1997 Nobel Prize in Physics-for development of methods to cool and trap atoms with laser light.
"Nobelist William Phillips Addresses ASA '99"

1948 births
Living people
MIT Department of Physics alumni
American Nobel laureates
American people of Italian descent
Optical physicists
Fellows of Optica (society)
Fellows of the American Physical Society
People from Harrisburg, Pennsylvania
People from Wilkes-Barre, Pennsylvania
Nobel laureates in Physics
University of Maryland, College Park faculty
Members of the United States National Academy of Sciences
American scientists
American United Methodists
Converts to Methodism
20th-century Methodists
21st-century Methodists